Plog Island is an island  long in Prydz Bay,  north of Lake Island and  west of Breidnes Peninsula, Vestfold Hills. Mapped by Norwegian cartographers from air photos taken by the Lars Christensen Expedition (1936–37) and named "Plogoy" (plow island), as being descriptive of the island's shape.

See also 
 List of antarctic and sub-antarctic islands

Islands of Princess Elizabeth Land